Cantharidella is a genus of small sea snails, marine gastropod molluscs in the subfamily Trochinae of the family Trochidae, the top snails.

Description
This genus consists of small forms with much the aspect of tiny Cantharidus. They are usually polished, narrowly or not perforate. The shell is conical, and elongated.

Distribution
This genus of marine species occurs off India, Sri Lanka, the Philippines and Australia (New South Wales, South Australia, Tasmania, Victoria, Western Australia).

Species
Species within the genus Cantharidella include:
 Cantharidella balteata (Philippi, 1849)
 Cantharidella beachportensis Cotton & Godfrey, 1934
 Cantharidella ocellina (Hedley, 1911)
 Cantharidella picturata (A. Adams & Angas, 1864)
 Cantharidella rottnestensis Verco, 1911
 Cantharidella tiberiana (Crosse, 1863)

Species brought into synonymy
 Cantharidella aurea Tenison-Woods, J.E., 1876: synonym of Cantharidella tiberiana (Crosse, 1863)
 Cantharidella tesselata Tenison-Woods, J.E., 1878: synonym of Cantharidella tiberiana (Crosse, 1863)
 Cantharidella tesselata (A. Adams, 1853): synonym of Cantharidus tessellatus (A. Adams, 1853)

References

Further reading 
 Powell A W B, New Zealand Mollusca, William Collins Publishers Ltd, Auckland, New Zealand 1979 
 Miller M & Batt G, Reef and Beach Life of New Zealand, William Collins (New Zealand) Ltd, Auckland, New Zealand 1973

External links

 
Trochidae
Gastropod genera